George William Goodyear (5 July 1916 – 16 July 2001) was an English professional footballer who played in the Football League for Southend United and Luton Town as a wing half.

Career statistics

References 

Clapton Orient F.C. wartime guest players
English Football League players
English footballers
1916 births
2001 deaths
Association football wing halves
Footballers from Luton
Hitchin Town F.C. players
Southend United F.C. players
Luton Town F.C. players
Crystal Palace F.C. players
Biggleswade Town F.C. players